Loutra Volvis is a village of the Volvi municipality. Before the 2011 local government reform it was part of the municipality of Apollonia. The 2011 census recorded 54 inhabitants in the village. Loutra Volvis is a part of the community of Nea Apollonia.

See also
 List of settlements in the Thessaloniki regional unit

References

Populated places in Thessaloniki (regional unit)